The Chapel of Rest, Brompton Cemetery, Brompton, Scarborough, in North Yorkshire, England is an early work by the ecclesiastical architect Temple Moore. It is a Grade II listed building.

History
In 1880, the newly-appointed vicar of All Saints, Brompton-by-Sawdon, the Rev. Francis Chambers, instigated a series of improvements to the church, including the closure of its original churchyard, and its replacement by a new cemetery. The construction of a chapel of rest in the new cemetery was financed by Sir George Cayley, the local squire, resident at Brompton Hall. Cayley's architect was Temple Lushington Moore, then aged 33, whose subsequent career saw him design about 40 new churches, and restore many more, becoming "England's leading ecclesiastical architect from the mid-Edwardian years".

Architecture and description
The chapel comprises a broad gable facing the cemetery, with an asymmetrical bell tower ending in a pyramidal roof. Pevsner, in his Yorkshire: The North Riding volume, records its "wonderfully lopsided" appearance, but does not attribute the chapel to Moore. The chapel was designated a Grade II listed building on 3 September 2019.

Footnotes

References

Sources
 

Grade II listed churches in North Yorkshire
Churches completed in 1889
19th-century Church of England church buildings
Gothic Revival church buildings in England
Gothic Revival architecture in North Yorkshire
Temple Moore buildings